Miki Gavrielov (מיקי גבריאלוב ; born 1949) is an Israeli composer and performer of folk/rock music. His career spans many decades, beginning with being a member of rock group The Churchills. Many of the most popular songs sung by Arik Einstein were ones for which Miki Gavrielov wrote the music. Writing his own songs and performing on his own, Miki Gavrielov brought in influences from other Mediterranean countries, notably Turkey, from which some of his ancestors immigrated to Israel. Gavrielov has released at least 17 studio albums.

Selected discography
ספור של חורף 2000 "Winter Story"

References

1949 births
Living people
Israeli people of Turkish-Jewish descent
Israeli people of Armenian-Jewish descent
Place of birth missing (living people)